Bega Shopping Center is a shopping center in the historical area of Timișoara owned by Bega Group.

History 
The Bega department store was inaugurated on 4 December 1973. The store was built according to a project by IPROTIM, with architect Vasile Oprișan as project manager. In this place, in the former Balaș Square, there was the Mocioni (or Mocsonyi) House; it housed a pawnshop and a housekeeping school and was demolished in 1948.

After its privatization in 1997, the Bega department store was bought by brothers Marius and Emil Cristescu, who transformed it into Bega Shopping Center and, over the years, completely changed the appearance of the building.

Facilities 
Bega Shopping Center has a main building and two wings. A  Carrefour supermarket located in the basement of the main building serves as anchor tenant. A 400-seat food court was opened on the third floor in 2012. As of 2021, stores include dm, Jolidon, Pepco, Puma and Yves Rocher.

References 

Shopping malls in Timișoara
Shopping malls established in 1973